This is a list of United Nations Security Council Resolutions 2501 to 2600 adopted between 16 December 2019 and 15 October 2021.

See also 
 Lists of United Nations Security Council resolutions
 List of United Nations Security Council Resolutions 2401 to 2500
 List of United Nations Security Council Resolutions 2601 to 2700

2501